Augustine Loof (born 1 January 1996) is a Dutch professional footballer who currently plays for Balzan F.C. as a centre back.

Career
Loof made his professional debut as Jong PSV player in the Jupiler League on 3 October 2014 against Roda JC Kerkrade in a 1-1 draw. He played the full game.

References

External links
 

1996 births
Living people
Dutch footballers
Dutch expatriate footballers
Netherlands youth international footballers
Eerste Divisie players
PSV Eindhoven players
FC Eindhoven players
Balzan F.C. players
People from Terneuzen
Association football defenders
Dutch expatriate sportspeople in Malta
Expatriate footballers in Malta
Footballers from Zeeland